Plagusia is a genus of crabs in the family Plagusiidae, containing the following species:
Plagusia depressa (Fabricius, 1775)
Plagusia immaculata Lamarck, 1818
Plagusia integripes Garth, 1973
Plagusia speciosa Dana, 1852
Plagusia squamosa (Herbst, 1790)

References

Grapsoidea